Dixie USFS Airport  is a public-use U.S. Forest Service airport located three nautical miles (3.5 mi, 5.6 km) southwest of the central business district of Dixie, in Idaho County, Idaho, United States.

Facilities and aircraft 
It has one runway designated 18/36 with a turf surface measuring 4,500 by 100 feet (1,372 x 30 m). For the 12-month period ending June 25, 2011, the airport had 1,300 aircraft operations, an average of 108 per month: 77% general aviation and 23% air taxi.

References

External links 
 Dixie USFS (A05) page at Idaho Transportation Department Airport Facility Directory
 Aerial photo as of 13 September 1998 from USGS The National Map
 

Airports in Idaho
Transportation in Idaho County, Idaho
United States Forest Service